Fjolla Kelmendi (born 14 December 1990) is a Kosovar judoka.

She is the silver medallist of the 2018 Judo Grand Prix Antalya in the -48 kg category.

She is the cousin of Olympic Champion Majlinda Kelmendi.

References

External links
 
 

1990 births
Living people
Kosovan female judoka